Jeremy Stuart Rossiter (born 18 June 1950) is a British auto racing driver. He has competed in various forms of motorsports including single-seater, sports cars and saloon cars. In 1989 he drove for the works Vauxhall team in the British Touring Car Championship.

His eldest son James is a racing driver who has been a Formula One test driver.

Racing record

Complete British Touring Car Championship results
(key) (Races in bold indicate pole position – 1988–1990 in class) (Races in italics indicate fastest lap – 1 point awarded ?–1989 in class)

‡ Endurance driver (ineligible for points).

References

External links

1950 births
Living people
British Touring Car Championship drivers
English racing drivers
24 Hours of Le Mans drivers
Place of birth missing (living people)
World Sportscar Championship drivers